Santiago Enrique Grillo Diez (born May 27, 1987 in Cali), known as Santiago Grillo, is a Colombian windsurfer who specialized in Neil Pryde RS:X class. A two-time Olympian (2008 and 2012), he is ranked no. 82 in the world for the sailboard class by the International Sailing Federation. Grillo also trains for Velas y Vientos in Cali under his Argentina-based personal coach Manuel Fumagallo.

Grillo made his debut at the 2008 Summer Olympics in Beijing, where he finished last out of thirty-five sailors in the men's RS:X class with a net score of 293.

At the 2012 Summer Olympics in London, as a 25 year old, Grillo qualified for his second Colombian team in the RS:X class by attaining a 53rd-place effort and an automatic berth at the World Championships in Cadiz, Spain. Struggling to attain a top position in the opening series, Grillo accumulated a net score of 302 points for a 37th-place finish in a fleet of 38 windsurfers.

Notes

References

External links
 
 
 

1987 births
Living people
Olympic sailors of Colombia
Colombian male sailors (sport)
Colombian windsurfers
Sailors at the 2008 Summer Olympics – RS:X
Sailors at the 2012 Summer Olympics – RS:X
Sailors at the 2016 Summer Olympics – RS:X
Sportspeople from Cali
Sailors at the 2015 Pan American Games
Pan American Games competitors for Colombia
21st-century Colombian people